Damiel Dossevi (born 3 February 1983) is a French pole vaulter.

He finished fifteenth at the 2006 European Championships. He also competed at the 2005 European Indoor Championships, the 2005 World Championships and the 2007 World Championships without reaching the final.

His personal best jump is 5.75 metres, which he achieved in July 2005 in Erfurt.

Personal life 
Dossevi was born in Chambray-lès-Tours. His father Othniel is a former footballer. His sister  is also an athlete. His uncle Pierre-Antoine and his cousins Thomas and Mathieu are all footballers.

Competition record

References

1983 births
Living people
People from Chambray-lès-Tours
French sportspeople of Togolese descent
French male pole vaulters
Sportspeople from Indre-et-Loire
Dossevi family
20th-century French people
21st-century French people